Henry Simpson Bridgeman (1757–1782) was a British politician who sat in the House of Commons from 1780 to 1782 .

Bridgeman was the eldest son of Henry Bridgeman and his wife  Elizabeth Simpson, daughter of Reverend John Simpson, and was born on  12 April 1757. He was educated at Harrow School and at Newcome's School at Hackney, and was admitted at Trinity College, Cambridge on 3 June  1775.
 
Bridgeman was returned as Member of Parliament for Wigan at a by-election on 21 August 1780 on the family interest, supported by the Duke of Portland.  He was again returned after a contest at the 1780 general election. He was in poor health from the summer of 1781 and was abroad at the beginning of 1782.

Bridgeman died unmarried on 26 July 1782. His brother Orlando succeeded to his father's titles.

References

1757 births
1782 deaths
People educated at Harrow School
Alumni of Trinity College, Cambridge
British MPs 1774–1780
British MPs 1780–1784
Members of the Parliament of Great Britain for English constituencies